Waleran III (or Walram III) ( – 2 July 1226) was initially lord of Montjoie, then count of Luxembourg from 1214. He became count of Arlon and duke of Limburg on his father's death in 1221. He was the son of Henry III of Limburg and Sophia of Saarbrücken.

As a younger son, he did not expect to inherit. He carried on an adventurous youth and took part in the Third Crusade in 1192. In 1208, the imperial candidate Philip of Swabia died and Waleran, his erstwhile supporter, turned to his opponent, Otto of Brunswick. In 1212, he accompanied his first cousin Henry I, Duke of Brabant, to Liège, then in a war with Guelders. Waleran's first wife, Cunigunda, a daughter of Frederick I, Duke of Lorraine, died in 1214 and in May he married Ermesinda of Luxembourg, and became count  there. Ermesinda claimed Namur and so Waleran added a crown to his coat of arms to symbolise this claim.

In 1221, he inherited Limburg and added a second tail to the rampant lion on his arms. This symbolised his holding of two great fiefs. In 1223, he again tried to take Namur from the Margrave Philip II. He failed and signed a peace treaty on 13 February in Dinant. He then took part in various imperial diets and accompanied the Emperor Frederick II into Italy. Returning from there, he died in Rolduc.

Family and children
Waleran had four children by his first wife, Cunigunda of Lorraine, daughter of Frederick I, Duke of Lorraine, and three children by his second wife, Ermesinda of Luxembourg.

Children with Cunigunda of Lorraine:

 Sophie (c. 1190 – 1226/27), married c. 1210 Frederick of Isenberg
 Matilda (c. 1192 – aft. 1234), married c. 1210 William III, Count of Jülich, mother of William IV, Count of Jülich
 Henry IV, Duke of Limburg, married Irmgard of Berg, heiress of the County of Berg, a daughter of the count Adolf VI 
 Waleran (c. 1200 – 1242), married Elisabeth of Bar, daughter of Ermesinda of Luxembourg and Theobald I, Count of Bar

Children with Ermesinde, Countess of Luxembourg:
 Catherine of Limburg (c. 1215 – 1255), married Matthias II, Duke of Lorraine, nephew of Waleran's first wife
 Henry V, Count of Luxembourg married Margaret of Bar
 Gerhard, Count of Durbuy

Notes

References

1160s births
1226 deaths
Year of birth uncertain
Counts of Arlon
Dukes of Limburg
House of Ardennes
Lords of Monschau
Christians of the Third Crusade
Christians of the Fifth Crusade